The Rough Guide to World Music is a world music compilation album originally released in the United Kingdom in 1994. The first of the World Music Network Rough Guides World Music series, it was co-released with an eponymous reference book. The album features artists hailing from Africa, the Americas, Asia, and Europe. Artwork was designed by Impetus, and the compilation was produced by Phil Stanton, co-founder of the World Music Network.

Reception

Raymond McKinney of AllMusic called the album an "ideal way to taste-test the endless flavors the genre has to offer." Michaelangelo Matos, writing for the Chicago Reader, described the first two thirds as "pretty scintillating" but the last third as "folkloric" and "boring".

Track listing

References

External links 
 

1994 compilation albums
World Music Network Rough Guide albums